Marina di Campo is a town in Tuscany, central Italy, administratively a frazione of the comune of Campo nell'Elba, province of Livorno.

Marina di Campo is the main town and municipal seat of the municipality of Campo nell'Elba, on the Elba Island.

Bibliography

External links 

Frazioni of Campo nell'Elba
Cities and towns in Tuscany